Star Kiran is an Indian Odia language general entertainment pay television channel owned by The Walt Disney Company India. a wholly owned by The Walt Disney Company. the channel has been launched on 6 June 2022. It broadcasts Odia television series and shows. It is said to bring the first Odia HD television channel in the country.

Etymology 
The word Kiran (କିରଣ) means ray of light in Odia language. The slogan of Star Kiran is Eithu Arambha, Eithi Sambhaba, which means "Starts from here, Possible here" in Odia language.

Reception

Functions 
The channel has a variety of shows as well as movies. It also made a Raja Festival Special program with Ollywood celebrities known as "Banaste Daakila Gaja". The channel also organised a special event for Independence day 2022 as "Ude Triranga" and Dussehra Show with Star Kiran Serial casts known as "Aama Ghara Dussehra".

Currently broadcasts

Drama series

Dubbed series

Formerly broadcasts

Drama series

Dubbed series

References 

Odia-language television channels
Disney Star
Television stations in Bhubaneswar
Companies based in Bhubaneswar
2022 establishments in Odisha
Television channels and stations established in 2022